Chanaq-e Sofla va Olya (also Romanized as Chanāq-e Soflá va ‘Olyā) is a village in Qeshlaq-e Jonubi Rural District, Qeshlaq Dasht District, Bileh Savar County, Ardabil Province, Iran. At the 2006 census, its population was 180, in 40 families.

References 

Towns and villages in Bileh Savar County